Barrelfish may refer to:

Animals
 Hyperoglyphe, a genus of fishes of the medusafish and butterfish family, also known as barrelfishes
 Hyperoglyphe perciformis, the barrelfish, a bathypelagic fish found in the Northern Atlantic Ocean with a wide range

Computers
 Barrelfish (operating system), an experimental computer operating system